Elaine Smith may refer to:

Elaine Smith (Scottish politician) (born 1963), Scottish Labour politician
Elaine Smith (Idaho politician), Democratic Idaho State Representative
Elaine Smith (actress) (born 1962), Scottish-born Australian actress
Elaine C. Smith (born 1958), Scottish actress and comedian
Elaine Smith, mother of Paula Yates and a showgirl, actress and writer of erotic novels, who used the stage names Helene Thornton and Heller Torren